George David Tilman (born Titman; July 22, 1949), ForMemRS, is an American ecologist. He is Regents Professor and McKnight Presidential Chair in Ecology at the University of Minnesota, as well as an instructor in Conservation Biology; Ecology, Evolution, and Behavior; and Microbial Ecology. He is director of the Cedar Creek Ecosystem Science Reserve long-term ecological research station. Tilman is also a professor at University of California, Santa Barbara's Bren School of Environmental Science & Management.

Early life and education 
Tilman (born Titman) was born in Aurora, Illinois in 1949. He earned his Bachelor of Science degree in zoology in 1971 and his PhD in ecology in 1976 at the University of Michigan. Some of his doctoral research was published in the journal Science.

Career and research 
In an August 2001 interview, Tilman states that his passion with ecology stems from his love for both math and biology, and ecology is a field that allows him to express both together along with his love for the outdoors. His work explores how both natural and managed ecosystems can be used to meet the needs of humans, whether it be for food, energy, or ecosystem services.  Tilman has performed several studies to further determine the usefulness of grasslands for utilization in biofuel.

Resource competition 
Tilman is best known for his work on the role of resource competition in community structure and on the role of biodiversity in ecosystem functioning. One of his most cited articles is the 1994 Nature article on the Biodiversity and stability in grasslands which provided data regarding an experiment that began in 1982 with more than 200 plots in a grassland field in the Cedar Creek Ecosystem Science Reserve in Minnesota. Each of these plots was continuously monitored for 20 years for factors such as species richness and biomass created by the community. Tilman's article looked at data both prior to and following a drought on the grassland plots in 1988, which provided surprising results.  The drought provided substantial disturbance and the biomass data showed a strong positive correlation between the plant diversity within the community and the stability of the community as a whole supporting the diversity-stability hypothesis.

"The level to which the soil solution concentration of a limiting resource is reduced by an equilibrial monoculture of a species is called R*. R* is the resource concentration a species requires for it to be able to persist in a habitat. A comparable concept, that of threshold density, exists for host-microparasite inter-actions. The species with the lowest R* for a limiting soil resource is predicted to be the superior competitor for that resource."

With regards to succession he focuses on resource ratios, particularly between light and nitrogen. After a big disturbance, the pattern of succession is from high light/low nitrogen towards high nitrogen/low light environment.

Competition and biodiversity 
Another article by Tilman that has received substantial citation is his 1994 Ecology article that encompasses the idea that large numbers of species can coexist in a small habitat even when they require the same limiting nutrient (such as nitrogen), as long as there is a tradeoff between the species.  Basically it means that they can coexist because species that are good competitors are not as good at colonizing or reproducing. In a related paper, Tilman used this model to demonstrate the phenomenon of "extinction debt," which refers to the time delay between habitat destruction and the extinction of species.

Awards and honors 
In 2014, he received the BBVA Foundation Frontiers of Knowledge Award in the Ecology and Conservation Biology category, for scientifically establishing the value of biodiversity, quantifying, for the first time, how it contributes to make ecosystems more productive, more resilient to invasions, and more stable in the face of perturbations such as drought. He has been a Guggenheim Fellow, is a Fellow of the American Association for the Advancement of Science and of the American Academy of Arts and Sciences, and is a member of the National Academy of Sciences. In 2000 Tilman was designated the Most Highly Cited Environmental Scientist of the Decade by Essential Science Indicators.

1996: Robert H. MacArthur Award
2013: Alexander von Humboldt Medal
2014: Ramon Margalef Prize in Ecology
2014: BBVA Foundation Frontiers of Knowledge Award
2017: Elected a Foreign Member of the Royal Society (ForMemRS)

References

External links 

Living people
1949 births
American ecologists
Mathematical ecologists
Environmental scientists
People from Aurora, Illinois
University of Michigan College of Literature, Science, and the Arts alumni
University of Minnesota faculty
Fellows of the American Association for the Advancement of Science
Fellows of the American Academy of Arts and Sciences
Members of the United States National Academy of Sciences
Winners of the Heineken Prize
Winners of the Ramon Margalef Prize in Ecology
Fellows of the Ecological Society of America
Foreign Members of the Royal Society